Velum may refer to:

Human anatomy
 Superior medullary velum, anterior medullary velum or valve of Vieussens, white matter, in the brain, which stretches between the superior cerebellar peduncles
 Frenulum of superior medullary velum, a slightly raised white band passing to the superior medullary velum
 Inferior medullary velum or posterior medullary velum, a thin layer of white substance, prolonged from the white center of the cerebellum
 Velum interpositum or choroid plexus, a structure in the brain where cerebrospinal fluid is produced
 Cavum veli interpositi, a condition in which the cistern of the velum interpositum becomes dilated
 Palatal velum or soft palate, the soft tissue constituting the back of the roof of the mouth
 Levator velum palatini muscle or levator veli palatini, the elevator muscle of the soft palate

Nature
 Velum (botany), a morphological feature of quillworts or Isoëtes
 Cumulonimbus velum, a cloud type
 Solemya velum, or Atlantic awning clam
 Agrotis velum or lycophotia molothina, a moth
 Velum or veil (mycology), one of several structures in fungi
 Velum, the locomotory and feeding organ found in the larval veliger stage of bivalves

Architecture
 Velarium, also known as velum, a textile overhang used in Roman times

See also
 Vellum, animal skin that is similar to parchment and that is used as medium for writing, book printing, and book binding